EFL League Two was created in 2004 after a renaming of the lower leagues in English football. Since the start of the newly re-branded league many players have scored a hat-trick.

The list includes only hat-tricks scored in the league; hat-tricks scored in play-off matches are not counted.

Hat-tricks

Note: The results column shows the home team score first

Multiple hat-tricks
The following table lists players who have scored two or more hat-tricks.

References

League Two